Zorotypus amazonensis is a species of insect in the genus Zorotypus. It is found in the central Amazonia. Males possess features that distinguish them from related species. The male cerci is elongated, curved, and studded with three stiff setae along inner margins allowing for a "clasperlike" appearance.

References

Zoraptera
Insects of Brazil
Insects described in 2006
Fauna of the Amazon